The Americas Zone is one of the three zones of regional Davis Cup competition in 2013.

In the Americas Zone there are three different groups in which teams compete against each other to advance to the next group.

Group I

Seeds:

Remaining nations:

Draw

Group II

Seeds:

Remaining nations:

Draw

Group III

 
 
  – promoted to Group II in 2014
 
 

 
 
 
  – promoted to Group II in 2014

References

External links
Official Website

 
Americas Zone
Davis Cup Americas Zone

it:Coppa Davis 2013 Zona Asia/Oceania Gruppo I
zh:2013年台維斯盃亞洲及大洋洲區第一級